The Independent Albums chart (previously titled Top Independent Albums) ranks the highest-selling independent music albums and extended plays (EPs) in the United States, as compiled by Nielsen SoundScan and published weekly by Billboard magazine. It is used to list artists who are not signed to major labels. Rankings are compiled by point-of-purchase sales obtained by Nielsen, and from legal music downloads from a variety of online music stores. The chart began in the week of February 5, 2000.

The top 25 positions are published through the Billboard website, with further chart positions available through a paid subscription to Billboard.biz. As with all Billboard charts, albums appearing on the Independent chart may also concurrently appear on the Billboard 200, the main chart published based solely on sales, as well as any of the other Billboard charts. In addition, exclusive album titles which are only sold through individual retail sites may also be included in the chart, following a revised chart policy announced on November 7, 2007.

The chart's first number one was Who Let the Dogs Out by Baha Men, which went on to top the year-end chart for 2001.

Best-selling top independent albums by year
Since 2002, Billboard.biz has annually published an end-of-year list of the top 50 best selling independent albums. Billboard also independently announced the highest selling album for 2001. Lil Jon & the East Side Boyz have topped this chart three times since its inception, twice with their 2002 album Kings of Crunk.
2001 (see 2001 in music): Baha Men - Who Let the Dogs Out
2002 (see 2002 in music): Mannheim Steamroller - Christmas Extraordinaire
2003 (see 2003 in music): Lil Jon & the East Side Boyz - Kings of Crunk
2004 (see 2004 in music): Lil Jon & the East Side Boyz - Kings of Crunk
2005 (see 2005 in music): Lil Jon & the East Side Boyz - Crunk Juice
2006 (see 2006 in music): Little Big Town - The Road to Here
2007 (see 2007 in music): Various Artists - Hairspray 
2008 (see 2008 in music): The Eagles - Long Road out of Eden
2009 (see 2009 in music): Jason Aldean - Wide Open
2010 (see 2010 in music): Jason Aldean - Wide Open
2011 (see 2011 in music): Jason Aldean - My Kinda Party
2012 (see 2012 in music): Mumford & Sons - Babel
2013 (see 2013 in music): Mumford & Sons - Babel
2014 (see 2014 in music): Garth Brooks - Blame It All on My Roots: Five Decades of Influences
2015 (see 2015 in music): Jason Aldean - Old Boots, New Dirt
2016 (see 2016 in music): Radiohead - A Moon Shaped Pool
2017 (see 2017 in music): Metallica - Hardwired... to Self-Destruct
2018 (see 2018 in music): Jason Aldean - Rearview Town
2019 (see 2019 in music): BTS - Map of the Soul: Persona
2020 (see 2020 in music): Bad Bunny – YHLQMDLG
2021 (see 2021 in music): Bad Bunny – El Último Tour Del Mundo

References

External links
Billboard Independent Albums
Billboard

Billboard charts